This is a list of nations, as represented by National Olympic Committees (NOCs), that have participated in the Summer Youth Olympic Games between 2010 and 2018. As of the 2018 Games, all of the current 206 NOCs have participated in at least one edition of the Olympic Games, and two hundred and three nations in all Summer Youth Olympic Games to date.

List of nations

Table legend

Alphabetical list

See also
List of participating nations at the Winter Youth Olympic Games